Six ships of the French Navy have bourne the name Colbert in honour of Jean Baptiste Colbert :

 , a French wheeled corvette, launched in  1848
  a French armoured frigate, launched in 1877
 , the class of the 1877 Colbert
 , an auxiliary patrol boat (1915–1917)
 , an auxiliary sail ship (1917)
  a World War II French heavy cruiser, launched in 1928, destroyed in the Scuttling of the French fleet in Toulon in 1942
 , an anti-aircraft cruiser, launched in 1956

See also
 Colbert (disambiguation)

French Navy ship names